Parashat Vayikra, VaYikra, Va-yikra, Wayyiqra, or Wayyiqro (—Hebrew for "and He called," the first word in the parashah) is the 24th weekly Torah portion (parashah) in the annual Jewish cycle of Torah reading and the first in the Book of Leviticus. The parashah lays out the laws of sacrifices (korbanot). It constitutes . 

The parashah has the most letters and words of any of the weekly Torah portions in the Book of Leviticus (although not the most verses). It is made up of 6,222 Hebrew letters, 1,673 Hebrew words, 111 verses, and 215 lines in a Torah scroll (Sefer Torah). (Parashat Emor has the most verses of any Torah portion in Leviticus.) Jews read it the 23rd or 24th Sabbath after Simchat Torah, generally in March or early April.

Readings

First reading—Leviticus 1:1–13
In the first reading, God called to Moses from the Tabernacle and told him the laws of the sacrifices. Burnt offerings (olah) could be bulls, rams or male goats, or turtle doves or pigeons, which the priest burned completely on wood on the altar.

Second reading—Leviticus 1:14–2:6
In the second reading, burnt offerings could also be turtle doves or pigeons, which the priest also burned completely on wood on the altar.

Meal offerings (minchah) were of choice flour with oil, from which priest would remove a token portion to burn on the altar, and the remainder the priests could eat.

Third reading—Leviticus 2:7–16
In the third reading, meal offering could also be cooked in a pan. Meal offerings could not contain leaven or honey, and had to be seasoned with salt. Meal offerings of first fruits had to be new ears parched with fire, grits of the fresh grain.

Fourth reading—Leviticus 3:1–17
In the fourth reading, sacrifices of well-being (shelamim) could be male or a female cattle, sheep, or goats, from which the priest would dash the blood on the sides of the altar and burn the fat around the entrails, the kidneys, and the protuberance on the liver on the altar.

Fifth reading—Leviticus 4:1–26
In the fifth reading, sin offerings (chatat) for unwitting sin by the High Priest or the community required sacrificing a bull, sprinkling its blood in the Tent of Meeting, burning on the altar the fat around the entrails, the kidneys, and the protuberance on the liver, and burning the rest of the bull on an ash heap outside the camp. Guilt offerings for unwitting sin by a chieftain required sacrificing a male goat, putting some of its blood on the horns of the altar, and burning its fat.

Sixth reading—Leviticus 4:27–5:10
In the sixth reading, guilt offerings for unwitting sin by a lay person required sacrificing a female goat, putting some of its blood on the horns of the altar, and burning its fat. Sin offerings were required for cases when a person:
was able to testify but did not give information,
touched any unclean thing,
touched human uncleanness, or
uttered an oath and forgot.
In such cases, the person had to confess and sacrifice a female sheep or goat; or if the person could not afford a sheep, two turtledoves or two pigeons.

Seventh reading—Leviticus 5:11–26
In the seventh reading, if a person could not afford two turtledoves or pigeons, then the person was to bring flour for a sin offering to the priest, and the priest would take a handful of it and make it smoke on the altar, and thereby make atonement.

Guilt offerings (asham) were required when a person was unwittingly remiss about any sacred thing. In such cases, the person had to sacrifice a ram and make restitution plus 20 percent to the priest. Similarly, guilt offerings were required when a person dealt deceitfully in the matter of a deposit or a pledge, through robbery, by fraud, or by finding something lost and lying about it. In such cases, the person had to sacrifice a ram and make restitution plus 20 percent to the victim.

Readings according to the triennial cycle
Jews who read the Torah according to the triennial cycle of Torah reading read the parashah according to the following schedule:

In inner-Biblical interpretation

The parashah has parallels or is discussed in these Biblical sources:

Leviticus chapter 1–7
In Psalm , God clarifies the purpose of sacrifices. God states that correct sacrifice was not the taking of a bull out of the sacrificer's house, nor the taking of a goat out of the sacrificer's fold, to convey to God, for every animal was already God's possession. The sacrificer was not to think of the sacrifice as food for God, for God neither hungers nor eats. Rather, the worshiper was to offer to God the sacrifice of thanksgiving and call upon God in times of trouble, and thus God would deliver the worshiper and the worshiper would honor God.

While  and  set out the procedure for the burnt offering (olah), before then,  reports that Noah offered burnt offerings (olot) of every clean beast and bird on an altar after the waters of the Flood subsided. The story of the Binding of Isaac includes three references to the burnt offering (olah). In , God told Abraham to take Isaac and offer him as a burnt offering (olah).  then reports that Abraham rose early in the morning and split the wood for the burnt offering (olah). And after the angel of the Lord averted Isaac's sacrifice,  reports that Abraham lifted up his eyes and saw a ram caught in a thicket, and Abraham then offered the ram as a burnt offering (olah) instead of his son.  reports that Moses pressed Pharaoh for Pharaoh to give the Israelites "sacrifices and burnt offerings" (zevachim v'olot) to offer to God. And  reports that after Jethro heard all that God did to Pharaoh and the Egyptians, Jethro offered a burnt offering and sacrifices (olah uzevachim) to God.

And then  reports that God had respect for Abel and his offering (minchato), but for Cain and his offering (minchato), God had no respect.

More generally, the Hebrew Bible addressed "sacrifices" (zevachim) generically in connection with Jacob and Moses. After Jacob and Laban reconciled,  reports that Jacob offered a sacrifice (zevach) on the mountain and shared a meal with his kinsmen. And after Jacob learned that Joseph was still alive in Egypt,  reports that Jacob journeyed to Beersheba and offered sacrifices (zevachim) to the God of his father Isaac. And Moses and Aaron argued repeatedly with Pharaoh over their request to go three days' journey into the wilderness and sacrifice (venizbechah) to God.

The Hebrew Bible also includes several ambiguous reports in which Abraham or Isaac built or returned to an altar and "called upon the name of the Lord." In these cases, the text implies but does not explicitly state that the Patriarch offered a sacrifice.

Leviticus chapter 5
And  requires the offender to bring to the priest an unblemished ram for a guilt offering, and the priest shall make atonement for the offender before God, and the offender shall be forgiven.  directs that when people commit any sin against God, then they shall confess and make restitution in full to the victim and add a fifth part. And  provides that if the victim has no heir to whom restitution may be made, the offender must make restitution to the priest, in addition to the ram of atonement.

In classical rabbinic interpretation
The parashah is discussed in these rabbinic sources from the era of the Mishnah and the Talmud:

Leviticus chapter 1
Leviticus Rabbah reports that Rav Assi said that young children began their Torah studies with Leviticus and not with Genesis because young children are pure, and the sacrifices explained in Leviticus are pure, so the pure studied the pure.

The Midrash compared this to the case of a king who commanded his servant to build him a palace. On everything the servant built, he wrote the name of the king. The servant wrote the name of the king on the walls, the pillars, and the roof beams. After some time the king entered the palace, and on everything he saw he found his name. The king thought that the servant had done him all this honor, and yet the servant remained outside. So the king had called that the servant might come right in. So, too, when God directed Moses to make God a Tabernacle, Moses wrote on everything he made "Even as the Lord commanded Moses." God thought that Moses had done God all this honor, and yet Moses remained outside. So God call Moses so that he might enter the innermost part of the Tabernacle. Therefore,  reports, "And the Lord called to Moses." Rabbi Samuel bar Nahman said in the name of Rabbi Nathan that "as the Lord commanded" is written 18 times in the section recounting the setting up of the Tabernacle in Parashat Pekudei, corresponding to the 18 vertebrae of the spinal column.

The Mishnah taught that a sacrifice was slaughtered for the sake of six things: (1) for the sake of the sacrifice for which it was consecrated, (2) for the sake of the offerer, (3) for the sake of the Divine Name, (4) for the sake of the altar fires, (5) for the sake of an aroma, and (6) for the sake of pleasing God, and a sin offering and a guilt offering for the sake of sin. Rabbi Jose taught that even if the offerer did not have any of these purposes at heart, the offering was valid, because it was a regulation of the court, since the intention was determined only by the priest who performed the service.

A Midrash taught that if people repent, it is accounted as if they had gone up to Jerusalem, built the Temple and the altars, and offered all the sacrifices ordained in the Torah. Rabbi Aha said in the name of Rabbi Hanina ben Pappa that God accounts studying the sacrifices as equivalent to offering them. Rav Huna taught that God said that engaging in the study of Mishnah is as if one were offering up sacrifices. Samuel taught that God said that engaging in the study of the law is as if one were building the Temple. And the Avot of Rabbi Natan taught that God loves Torah study more than sacrifice.

Rabbi Ammi taught that Abraham asked God if Israel would come to sin, would God punish them as God punished the generation of the Flood and the generation of the Tower of Babel. God answered that God would not. Abraham then asked God in  “How shall I know?” God replied in  “Take Me a heifer of three years old . . .” (indicating that Israel would obtain forgiveness through sacrifices). Abraham then asked God what Israel would do when the Temple would no longer exist. God replied that whenever Jews read the Biblical text dealing with sacrifices, God would reckon it as if they were bringing an offering, and forgive all their iniquities.

Rav Sheshet continued that he had fasted and his fat and blood had diminished, so he asked that it be God's will to account Rav Sheshet fat and blood that had been diminished as if he had offered them on the Altar.

Rabbi Isaac declared that prayer is greater than sacrifice.

The Avot of Rabbi Natan taught that as Rabban Joḥanan ben Zakai and Rabbi Joshua were leaving Jerusalem, Rabbi Joshua expressed sorrow that the place where the Israelites had atoned for their iniquities had been destroyed. But Rabban Joḥanan ben Zakai told him not to grieve, for we have in acts of loving-kindness another atonement as effective as sacrifice at the Temple, as  says, “For I desire mercy, and not sacrifice.”

God appears to nations other that Israel only as one who comes from a distance, as  says, "They came from a far country to me." But in connection with the prophets of Israel,  says, "And the Lord appeared," and  says, "And the Lord called," implying from the immediate vicinity. Rabbi Haninah compared the difference between the prophets of Israel and the prophets of other nations to a king who was with his friend in a chamber (separated by a curtain). Whenever the king desired to speak to his friend, he folded up the curtain and spoke to him. (But God speaks to the prophets of other nations without folding back the curtain.) The Rabbis compared it to a king who has a wife and a concubine; to his wife he goes openly, but to his concubine he repairs with stealth. Similarly, God appears to non-Jews only at night, as  says, "And God came to Balaam at night," and  says, "And God came to Laban the Aramean in a dream of the night."

And the Sifra deduced from God's calling "to him" in  that God meant to speak to Moses alone, to the exclusion of even Aaron. Rabbi Judah ben Betera noted that God spoke to Moses and Aaron together in 13 passages, and to Moses alone in 13 passages, teaching that in these latter passages, Moses was then to inform Aaron. And Rabbi Jose the Galilean deduced from the use of "at the tent of meeting" in  that every time that God spoke to Moses at the tent of meeting, God spoke to Moses alone, to the exclusion of Aaron. Rabbi Tanḥum ben Ḥanilai found in God's calling to Moses alone in  proof that a burden that is too heavy for 600,000—hearing the voice of God (see )—can nonetheless be light for one. And the Sifra also deduced from  that God's voice, perhaps because it was subdued, resonated only within the tent itself.

Rabbi Tanḥuma said in the name of Rabbi Joshua ben Korchah that  demonstrated that out of the 10 different names that Scripture applied to Moses, God always addressed Moses by his given name.

The Sifra taught that the term "any man" (adam) in  encompassed converts. But the term "of you" excluded apostates.

Rabbi Judah read , "Speak to the children (benei) of Israel," to mean that the "sons" (benei) of Israel could lay hands (smichah) on a sacrifice before it was offered, but not the “daughters” (benot) of Israel. Rabbi Jose and Rabbi Simeon, however, disagreed, teaching that women also could lay hands on sacrifices. Abaye taught that a Baraita followed Rabbi Jose and Rabbi Simeon when it taught that both women and children can blow the shofar on Rosh Hashanah.

Rabbi Simeon ben Yoḥai taught that, generally speaking, the Torah required a burnt offering only as expiation for sinful meditation of the heart.

The Mishnah taught that the burnt offering was an offering of the most sacred order. It was consumed in its entirety, with the exception of its hide, by the fire of the altar.

The Mishnah deduced from  that the offerer only effected atonement if the offerer brought the offering voluntarily, but if the offerer pledged to bring a burnt offering, the Mishnah taught that they compelled the offerer to state that the offering was voluntary. And the Mishnah taught that the intention of the priest conducting the sacrifice determined whether the offering would prove valid.

The Tanna reasoned that by saying “according to the ordinance,”  referred to the rules that  applied to voluntary burnt offerings, and thus taught that those rules also applied to obligatory burnt offerings. The Tanna concluded that as  required laying on of hands for voluntary burnt offerings, the law also required laying on of hands for obligatory burnt offerings.

The Gemara interpreted the requirement of  that the priest "dash the blood round about against the altar" to teach that the priest threw the blood against two opposing corners of the altar, thus hitting all four sides of the altar and satisfying the requirement to dash the altar "round about."

Rabbi Eliezer (or some say Rabbi Eliezer ben Jacob) taught that Nadab and Abihu died in  only because they gave a legal decision interpreting  in the presence of their Master Moses. Even though  reports that "fire came forth from before the Lord and consumed the burnt offering and the fat on the altar," Nadab and Abihu deduced from the command of  that "the sons of Aaron the priest shall put fire upon the altar" that the priests still had a religious duty to bring some ordinary fire to the altar, as well.

The Mishnah noted that ; ; and  each use the same words, "an offering made by fire, of a sweet savor to the Lord," whether to describe the burnt offering of a beast, a bird offering, or even a meal offering. (And ; ; ; and  provided that people of lesser means could bring less-expensive offerings.) The Mishnah deduced from this that one who sacrificed much and one who sacrificed little attained equal merit, so long as the donors directed their hearts to Heaven. Rabbi Zera taught that  provided a Scriptural proof for this when it says, "Sweet is the sleep of a serving man, whether he eat little or much." Rav Adda bar Ahavah taught that  provided a Scriptural proof for this when it says, "When goods increase, they are increased who eat them; and what advantage is there to the owner thereof." Rabbi Simeon ben Azzai taught that Scripture says of a large ox, "An offering made by fire of a sweet savor"; of a small bird, "An offering made by fire of a sweet savor"; and of a meal offering, "An offering made by fire of a sweet savor." Rabbi Simeon ben Azzai thus taught that Scripture uses the same expression each time to teach that it is the same whether people offered much or little, so long as they directed their hearts to Heaven. Rabbi Isaac taught that  uses the word "soul" (nefesh) because God noted that the one who usually brought a meal offering was a poor man, and God accounted it as if the poor man had offered his own soul.

Similarly, Leviticus Rabbah reports that Rabbi Joshua of Siknin taught in the name of Rabbi Levi that God tried to accommodate the Israelites’ financial condition, as God told them that whoever had become liable to bring a sacrifice should bring from the herd, as  says, “If his offering be a burnt offering of the herd.” But if the offerer could not afford a sacrifice from the herd, then the offerer could bring a lamb, as  says, “And if he bring a lamb . . . .” If the offerer could not afford to bring a lamb, then the offerer could bring a goat, as  says, “And if his offering be a goat.” If the offerer could not afford to bring a goat, then the offerer could bring a bird, as  says, “And if his offering . . . be . . . of fowls.” If the offerer could not afford to bring a bird, then the offerer could bring fine flour, as  says, “fine flour for a meal offering.” Other offerings could not be offered in halves, but this one was to be offered in halves, as  says, “half thereof in the morning, and half thereof in the evening.” And Scripture accounted one who offered it as if offering a sacrifice from one end of the world to the other, as  says, “For from the rising of the sun even to the going down of the same, My name is great among the nations; and in every place offerings are presented to My name, even a pure meal offering.” 

The Sifra deduced from  that God occasionally began freestanding statements to Moses so as to allow Moses a pause to collect his thoughts. The Sifra generalized from this example that it was all the more appropriate for ordinary people to speak deliberately in conversation with other people.

Leviticus chapter 2

Leviticus chapter 3
The Gemara deduced from the words "And if his offering be a sacrifice of peace offerings" in  that for an offering to be effective, one needed to slaughter the sacrifice for the sake of its being a peace offering.

Rabbi Judah taught that whoever brought a peace offering brought peace to the world. Rabbi Simeon taught that they are called "peace offerings" because all are at peace, each sharing in them. The blood and the limbs were for the altar, the breast and the thigh for the priests, and the hide and the meat for the owner.

The Mishnah taught that because the peace offering was a sacrifice of lesser sanctity, it could be slain in any part of the Temple court. The three verses taken together taught that all sides of the Temple court were fit for performing sacrifices of lesser sanctity.

The Gemara deduced from the words "And the priest shall make it smoke" in  that the priest must not mix portions of one sacrifice with those of another. And the Gemara cited a Baraita to interpret the words "And the priest shall make them smoke"  to teach that the priest had to burn all the sacrificed parts of an offering at the same time.

A Midrash interpreted , "The Lord lets loose the prisoners," to read, "The Lord permits the forbidden," and thus to teach that what God forbade in one case, God permitted in another. God forbade consuming the sciatic nerve in animals (in ) but permitted it in fowl. God forbade eating meat without ritual slaughter (in ) but permitted it for fish. Similarly, Rabbi Abba and Rabbi Jonathan in the name of Rabbi Levi taught that God permitted more things than God forbade.

 reserved for God all animal fat and blood. The Gemara recounted that when Rabbi Sheshet would fast, he would pray: “Master of the Universe, it is revealed before You that when the Temple is standing, one sins and offers a sacrifice. And although only its fat and blood were offered from that sacrifice on the altar, [the offerer’s] transgression is atoned for. And now, I sat in observance of a fast and my fat and blood diminished. May it be Your will that my fat and blood that diminished be considered as if I offered a sacrifice before You on the altar, and may I find favor in Your eyes.”

The Sages taught that one may trust butchers to remove the fat that  and  forbids.

Leviticus chapter 4
But the bull (as well as the scapegoat, the other bull, and the red cow) did not itself render unclean clothes with which it came in contact. The Mishnah imagined the clothing saying to the person: "Those that render you unclean do not render me unclean, but you render me unclean."

woman and her daughter, (8) a married woman, (9) his sister, (10) his father's sister, (11) his mother's sister, (12) his wife's sister, (13) his brother's wife, (14) the wife of his father's brother, or (15) a menstruating woman; when one (16) blasphemes, (17) serves idols, (18) dedicates children to Molech, (19) has a familiar spirit, (20) desecrates the Sabbath, (21) eats of sacrificial food while unclean, (22) enters the precincts of the Temple in an unclean state, eats (23) forbidden fat, (24) blood, (25) remnant, or (26) refuse, (27) slaughters or (28) offers up a consecrated animal outside the Temple precincts, (29) eats anything leavened on Passover, (30) eats or (31) works on Yom Kippur, compounds sacred (32) anointing oil or (33) incense, (34) uses sacred anointing oil improperly, or transgresses the laws of (35) the Passover offering or (36) circumcision.

Reading , “And He said to him: ‘Take me a heifer of three years old (meshuleshet), a she-goat of three years old (meshuleshet), and a ram of three years old (meshulash),’” a Midrash read , meshuleshet, to mean “three-fold” or “three kinds,” indicating sacrifices for three different purposes. The Midrash deduced that God thus showed Abraham three kinds of bullocks, three kinds of goats, and three kinds of rams that Abraham's descendants would need to sacrifice. The three kinds of bullocks were: (1) the bullock that  would require the Israelites to sacrifice on the Day of Atonement (Yom Kippur), (2) the bullock that  would require the Israelites to bring on account of unwitting transgression of the law, and (3) the heifer whose neck  would require the Israelites to break. The three kinds of goats were: (1) the goats that  would require the Israelites to sacrifice on festivals, (2) the goats that  would require the Israelites to sacrifice on the New Moon (Rosh Chodesh), and (3) the goat that  would require an individual to bring. The three kinds of rams were: (1) the guilt offering of certain obligation that , for example, would require one who committed a trespass to bring, (2) the guilt offering of doubt to which one would be liable when in doubt whether one had committed a transgression, and (3) the lamb to be brought by an individual. The Rabbis said that God showed Abraham the tenth of an ephah as well, for  says “all these (eleh),” just as  says, “And you shall bring the meal offering that is made of these things (me-eleh),” and the use of “these” in both verses hints that both verses refer to the same thing. And reading , “But the bird divided he not,” the Midrash deduced that God intimated to Abraham that the bird burnt offering would be divided, but the bird sin offering (which the dove and young pigeon symbolized) would not be divided.

Reading , “When (asher) a ruler (nasi) sins,” Rabban Joḥanan ben Zakai said, “Happy (ashrei) is the generation whose leader (nasi) is strong enough to admit having sinned!”

The Mishnah taught that bringing the sin offering (chatat) of  atoned for sin.

Leviticus chapter 5
Rabbi Joshua of Siknin taught in the name of Rabbi Levi that  uses the word "soul" (nefesh) six times, corresponding to the six days of Creation. God said to the soul that all that God created in the six days of creation God created for the sake of the soul, and then the soul went and sinned! And thus,  begins, "When a soul sins . . . ."

The Mishnah supposed that a witness, after having been cautioned about the grave responsibility of being a witness, would think that the witness should just avoid the trouble of testifying. The Mishnah taught that this is why  says, "And he witnessed or saw or knew, if didn't say anything, he bears the sin." (And thus the witness must testify.)

The Mishnah (following ) taught that a sin offering of a bird preceded a burnt offering of a bird; and the priest also dedicated them in that order. Rabbi Eliezer taught that wherever an offerer (because of poverty) substituted for an animal sin offering the offering of two birds (one of which was for a sin offering and the other for a burnt offering), the priest sacrificed the bird sin offering before the bird burnt offering (as  instructs). Wherever the offering came on account of sin, the sin offering took precedence. But here (in the case of a woman after childbirth, where the sin offering was not on account of sin) the burnt offering took precedence. And wherever both birds came instead of one animal sin offering, the sin offering took precedence. But here (in the case of a woman after childbirth) they did not both come on account of a sin offering (for in poverty she substituted a bird burnt offering for an animal burnt offering, as  required her to bring a bird sin offering in any case), the burnt offering took precedence. (The Gemara asked whether this contradicted the Mishnah, which taught that a bird sin offering took precedence over an animal burnt offering, whereas here she brought the animal burnt offering before the bird sin offering.) Rava taught that  merely accorded the bird burnt offering precedence in the mentioning. (Thus, some read Rava to teach that  lets the reader read first about the burnt offering, but in fact the priest sacrificed the sin offering first. Others read Rava to teach that one first dedicated the animal or bird for the burnt offering and then dedicated the bird for the sin offering, but in fact the priest sacrificed the sin offering first.)

The Mishnah taught that if one stole from another something worth a perutah (the minimum amount of significant value) and the thief nonetheless swore that the thief did not do so, the thief was obliged to take restitution to the victim even if the thief needed to go as far as Media (in what is now Iran). The thief could not give restitution to the victim's son or agent, but the thief could give it to an agent of the court. If the victim died, the thief had to restore it to the victim's heirs.

(The Mishnah did not consider the payment of the fifth as an essential condition of atonement.) If, however, the thief paid the victim the fifth but not the principal; or the victim excused the thief the fifth but not the principal; or even where the victim excused the thief for both, except for something more than the value of a perutah remaining of the principal, then the thief would have to convey it personally to the victim (even as far as Media).

If the depositor asked where the thing deposited was, and an unpaid custodian replied that it was lost, and the depositor then imposed an oath on the custodian, and the custodian swore that the deposit was lost, if witnesses then testified that the custodian consumed the thing deposited, then the custodian had to repay the principal.

The Mishnah taught that if one stole from one's father and, when charged by the father, denied it on oath, and the father then died before the child confessed to the father's heirs, then the child would have to repay the principal and a fifth to the father's other children or to the father's brothers (the child's uncles) if the child had no siblings. But if the child was unwilling to forfeit the child's share in the payment that child had to make, or if the child had no resources, then the child was to borrow the amount from others and perform the duty of restoration to the heirs, and the creditors could subsequently come and demand to be paid the portion that would by law have belonged to the child as heir.

The Mishnah interpreted the requirements of  regarding restitution where the victim died without kin to apply as well to where a proselyte victim died. The wrongdoer would have to pay the priests the principal plus 20 percent and bring a trespass offering to the altar. If the wrongdoer died bringing the money and the offering to Jerusalem, the money was to go to the wrongdoer's heirs, and the offering was to be kept on the pasture until it became blemished, when it was to be sold and the proceeds were to go to the fund for freewill offerings. But if the wrongdoer had already given the money to the priest and then died, the heirs could not retrieve the funds, for  provides that "whatever any man gives to the priest shall be his."

The Mishnah taught that an offering that was more sacred than another preceded the other offering. If there was blood of a sin offering and blood of a burnt offering to be presented, the blood of the sin offering preceded the blood of the burnt offering, because it effected atonement for severe transgressions punishable by extirpation. If there were portions of a burnt offering and portions of a sin offering to be burned on the altar, the burning of the portions of the burnt offering preceded the portions of the sin offering, because the burnt offering was entirely burned in the flames on the altar, while only part of the sin offering was burned. Similarly, although both effect atonement, a sin offering preceded a guilt offering, because its blood was placed on the four corners of the altar and the remnants of its blood were poured on the base of the altar, while the blood of the guilt offering was sprinkled on only two corners of the altar. A guilt offering preceded a thank offering and the Nazirite’s ram, as it was an offering of the most sacred order, and the others were offerings of lesser sanctity. A thank offering and a Nazirite’s ram preceded a peace offering, as they were eaten in one day, like offerings of the most sacred order, while a peace offering was eaten for two days, and the thank offering and Nazirite’s ram required loaves to be brought with them. Sacrifice of the peace offering preceded sacrifice of the firstborn offering, as the peace offering required placing the blood on the altar, placing hands on the head of the offering, libations, and the waving of the breast and the thigh by the priest and the owner, none of which was required for the firstborn offering.

In medieval Jewish interpretation
The parashah is discussed in these medieval Jewish sources:

Leviticus chapters 1–7

Maimonides and Nachmanides differed about the reason for the sacrificial system. Maimonides wrote that the reason for the offerings was because when the Israelites lived in Egypt and Chaldea, the Egyptians worshipped sheep and the Chaldeans worshipped demons in the form of goats. And people in India never slaughter cattle. Thus, God commanded the Israelites to slaughter cattle, sheep, and goats to God, so that worshipers of the other lands would know that God required the very act that they considered to be the utmost sin, and through that act God would forgive Israel's sins. God thus intended to cure the people of the other nations of false beliefs, which Maimonides characterized as diseases of the soul, for diseases are healed by medicines that are antithetical to the diseases.

Maimonides taught that God instituted the practice of sacrifices as a transitional step to wean the Israelites from the worship of the times and move them toward prayer as the primary means of worship. Maimonides noted that in nature, God created animals that develop gradually. For example, when a mammal is born, it is extremely tender, and cannot eat dry food, so God provided breasts that yield milk to feed the young animal, until it can eat dry food. Similarly, Maimonides taught, God instituted many laws as temporary measures, as it would have been impossible for the Israelites to suddenly discontinue everything to which they had become accustomed. So God sent Moses to make the Israelites (in the words of ) "a kingdom of priests and a holy nation." But the general custom of worship in those days was sacrificing animals in temples that contained idols. So God did not command the Israelites to give up those manners of service, but allowed them to continue. God transferred to God's service what had formerly served as a worship of idols, and commanded the Israelites to serve God in the same manner—namely, to build to a Sanctuary, to erect the altar to God's name, to offer sacrifices to God, to bow down to God, and to burn incense before God. By this Divine plan, God blotted out the traces of idolatry, and established the great principle of the Existence and Unity of God. But the sacrificial service, Maimonides taught, was not the primary object of God's commandments about sacrifice; rather, supplications, prayers, and similar kinds of worship are nearer to the primary object. Thus, God limited sacrifice to only one Temple (see ) and the priesthood to only the members of a particular family. These restrictions, Maimonides taught, served to limit sacrificial worship, and kept it within such bounds that God did not feel it necessary to abolish sacrificial service altogether. But in the Divine plan, prayer and supplication can be offered everywhere and by every person, as can be the wearing of tzitzit and tefillin (16) and similar kinds of service.

Nachmanides, on the other hand, noted that  mentioned a reason for the offerings—that they are "a fire offering, of a pleasing odor to the Eternal." Nachmanides rejected the argument that the offerings were meant to eliminate the foreigners' foolish ideas, for the sacrifices would not have that effect, as the foreigners' intention was to worship the constellations of the sheep and the ox, and if Jews slaughtered sheep and oxen to God, it would show respect and honor to those constellations. Nachmanides further noted that when Noah came out of the ark, there were as yet no Chaldeans or Egyptians in the world, yet Noah brought an offering that pleased God so much that  reports that on its account God said, "I will not again curse the ground anymore for man's sake." Similarly, Abel brought of the first-born of his flock and  reports that "the Eternal had regard to Abel and to his offering," but there had not yet been a trace of idol worship in the world. In , Balaam said, "I have prepared the seven altars, and I have offered up a bullock and a ram on every altar," but his intent was not to eradicate evil beliefs from Balak's mind, but rather to approach God so that God's communication would reach Balaam. Nachmanides argued that the reason for the offerings was more likely that since people's deeds are accomplished through thought, speech, and action, therefore God commanded that when people sin and bring an offering, they should lay their hands on it in contrast to the evil deed that they committed. Offerers would confess their sin verbally to contrast with their evil speech. They would burn parts of the animal in fire that were seen as the instruments of thought and desire in human beings. The offerers would burn the legs of the animal because they corresponded to the limbs with which the offerer acted. The offerer sprinkled blood on the altar, which is analogous to the blood in the offerer’s body. Nachmanides argued that offerers performed these acts so that the offerers should realize that the offerers had sinned against God with their bodies. And the offerer’s soul and blood should have been spilled and the offerer’s body burned, were it not for God's loving-kindness in taking a substitute and a ransom—the offering—so that the offering's blood should be in place of the offerer’s blood, its life in place of the offerer’s life, and that the limbs of the offering in place of the parts of the offerer’s body.

Leviticus chapter 4
Rabbi Isaac explained that the reason for the differing language was that it was exceptional for the High Priest to sin, since he felt his responsibility to God, Israel, and each individual. Similarly, it was very exceptional for the whole congregation to commit one and the same sin, for if some committed it, others would not. But a ruler heart is uplifted because of the ruler's power, and therefore the ruler is almost bound to sin; hence it says here “when” and not “if.”

In modern interpretation
The parashah is discussed in these modern sources:

Leviticus chapters 1–7

James Kugel reported that ancient texts offered several explanations for why peoples of the ancient Near East sacrificed animals: to provide the deity food (see ); to offer the life of the slaughtered animal as a substitute for the offerer’s; to give a costly possession as a sign of fealty or in the hope of receiving still more generous compensation from the deity. Kugel reported that more recent explanations saw the sacrifice as establishing a tangible connection between the offerer and the deity, while others stress the connection of the sacred with violence or see the function of religion as defusing violence that would otherwise be directed at people. Kugel argued that the Israelites conceived of animal sacrifices as the principal channel of communication between the people and God. William Hallo described sacrifice as a sacred-making of the human consumption of animal meat that followed.<ref>William W. Hallo, “Leviticus and Ancient Near Eastern Literature,” in ‘'The Torah: A Modern Commentary, revised edition, edited by W. Gunther Plaut, revised edition edited by David E.S. Stern, page 652.</ref>

Jacob Milgrom read the sacrificial system in the parashah to describe the forces of life and death pitted against each other in a cosmic struggle, set loose by people through their obedience to or defiance of God's commandments. Milgrom taught that Leviticus treats impurity as the opposite of holiness, identifying impurity with death and holiness with life. Milgrom interpreted Leviticus to teach that people could drive God out of the sanctuary by polluting it with their moral and ritual sins. But the priests could periodically purge the sanctuary of its impurities and influence the people to atone. The blood of the purification offerings symbolically purged the sanctuary by symbolically absorbing its impurities, in a victory for life over death.

Similarly, Gordon Wenham noted that the sacrificial system regularly associates sacrifices with cleansing and sanctification. Wenham read Leviticus to teach that sacrificial blood was necessary to cleanse and sanctify. Sacrifice could undo the effects of sin and human infirmity. Sin and disease profaned the holy and polluted the clean, whereas sacrifice could reverse this process. Wenham illustrated with the chart at right. Wenham concluded that contact between the holy and the unclean resulted in death. Sacrifice, by cleansing the unclean, made such contact possible. Sacrifice thus allowed the holy God to meet with sinful man.

Mary Douglas wrote that to find the underlying logic of the first chapters of Leviticus about how to make a sacrifice and how to lay out the animal sections on the altar, one needs to look carefully at what Leviticus says about bodies and parts of bodies, what is inner and outer, and what is on top and underneath. Douglas suggested this alignment of the three levels of Mount Sinai, the animal sacrifice, and the Tabernacle:

Douglas argued that the tabernacle ran horizontally toward the most sacred area, Mount Sinai went up vertically to the summit, and the sacrificial pile started with the head underneath and went up to the entrails, and one can interpret each by reference to the others. Douglas noted that in mystical thought, “upper” and “inner” can be equivalent. The pattern is always there throughout creation, with God in the depths or on the heights of everything. Likening the tabernacle to a body, the innards corresponded to the Holy of Holies, for the Bible locates the emotions and thought in the innermost parts of the body; the loins are wrung with remorse or grief; God scrutinizes the innermost part; compassion resides in the bowels. The Tabernacle was associated with creation, and creation with fertility, implying that the innermost part of the Tabernacle was a Divine nuptial chamber, depicting the union between God and Israel. Douglas concluded that the summit of the mountain was the abode of God, below was the cloudy region that only Moses could enter, and the lower slopes were where the priests and congregation waited, and analogously, the order of placing the parts of the animal on the altar marked out three zones on the carcass, the suet set around and below the diaphragm corresponding to the cloud girdling the middle of the mountain.

No Israelite could claim to be exempt from its provisions. Like royal and oracular texts that their framework evokes,  intended to persuade the Israelites and the priests to perform the offerings correctly, as specified in the text. But  also aimed to reinforce the authority of the Torah over religious performance in the Temple. By publicly stipulating the forms of the Israelite's offerings,  positioned priests and laity to monitor each other's performance, with the text as the arbiter of correct practice. Thus  shifted cultic authority from the priesthood to the book.

Bernard Bamberger noted that while the Rabbis introduced into the synagogue several practices formerly associated with the Temple, they made no provision for "interim" sacrifices, even though they could have found precedents for sacrifice outside Jerusalem. When the Roman Empire destroyed the Jerusalem Temple, the Rabbis did not choose to follow those precedents for sacrifice elsewhere, but instead set up a substitute, declaring the study of the sacrificial laws as acceptable to God as sacrifices. Bamberger suggested that some scholars may have felt that the day of sacrifice had passed.

Leviticus chapter 1

Leviticus chapter 2
Milgrom saw in the sacrificial texts a recurring theme of concern for the poor: Everyone, regardless of means, was able to bring an acceptable offering to God.

Leviticus chapter 3
Milgrom taught that in the original Priestly source ("P"), an offerer brought the well-being offering in  solely out of joyous motivations like thanksgiving, vow fulfillment, or spontaneous free will. The offerer shared the meat of the offering with family and friends. Milgrom reasoned that the advent of the Holiness Code ("H") brought another dimension to the sacrifice of the well-being connected with the prohibition of consuming blood. H's ban on nonsacrificial slaughter meant that all meat eaten as food had initially to be sanctified on the altar as a well-being offering.

Leviticus chapter 4
Milgrom called this pollution the Priestly Picture of Dorian Gray: While sin might not scar the face of the sinner, it did scar the face of the sanctuary. This image illustrated a Priestly version of the doctrine of collective responsibility: When evildoers sinned, they brought the more righteous down with them. Those who perished with the wicked were not entirely blameless, but inadvertent sinners who, by having allowed the wicked to flourish, also contributed to pollution of the sanctuary. Thus, in the Priestly scheme, brazen sins (the leaders' rapacity) and inadvertent sins (the silent majority's acquiescence) polluted the sanctuary (and corrupted society), driving God out of the sanctuary and leading to national destruction. In the theology of the purification offering, the sanctuary needed constant purification lest God abandon it because of the people's rebellious and inadvertent sins.

Leviticus chapter 5
Milgrom taught that the guilt or reparation offering in  might seem at first glance to be restricted to offenses against God's sanctum or name, but reflected wider theological implications. Milgrom inferred from this relationship that expiation by sacrifice depended on both the worshiper's remorse and the reparation that the worshiper brought to both God and people to rectify the wrong. Milgrom saw here Priestly lawmakers in action, bending the sacrificial rules to foster the growth of individual conscience, permitting sacrificial expiation for a deliberate crime against God (knowingly taking a false oath) provided that the person repented before being apprehended. Thus  ordains that repentance converted an intentional sin into an unintentional one, making it eligible for sacrificial expiation.

Milgrom concluded that the sin or purification offering taught the "ecology of morality," that the sins of the individual adversely affect society even when committed inadvertently, and the guilt or reparation offering fostered a doctrine of repentance. Milgrom noted that  did not prescribe the sin or purification offering just for cultic violations but in  extended the meaning of the term "communal" to embrace the broader area of ethical violations. And Milgrom saw in the discussion of the guilt or reparation offering in  that in matters of expiation, one had to rectify one's relationship with other people before seeking to rectify one's relationship with God.

In critical analysis
Scholars who follow the Documentary Hypothesis attribute the parashah to the Priestly source who wrote in the 6th or 5th century BCE.

Commandments
According to Sefer ha-Chinuch, there are 11 positive and 5 negative commandments in the parashah:
To carry out the procedure of the burnt offering as prescribed in the Torah
To bring meal offerings as prescribed in the Torah
Not to burn honey or yeast on the altar
Not to omit the salt from sacrifices
To salt all sacrifices
The Sanhedrin must bring an offering when it rules in error.
To bring a sin offering for transgression
Anybody who knows evidence must testify in court.
To bring an offering of greater or lesser value (if the person is wealthy, an animal; if poor, a bird or meal offering)
Not to decapitate a fowl brought as a sin offering
Not to put oil on the meal offerings of wrongdoers
Not to put frankincense on meal offerings
One who profaned property must repay what he profaned plus a fifth and bring a sacrifice.
To bring an offering when uncertain of guilt
To return the robbed object or its value
To bring an offering when guilt is certain

In the liturgy
The list of animals from which the Israelites could bring sacrifices in  provides an application of the fourth of the Thirteen Rules for interpreting the Torah in the Baraita of Rabbi Ishmael that many Jews read as part of the readings before the Pesukei d'Zimrah prayer service. The rule provides that when the general precedes the specific, the law applies only to the specific.  says, "you shall bring your offering from the domestic animals, even from the herd or from the flock." Applying the fourth rule teaches that Israelites could bring sacrifices from no domestic animals other than cattle from the herd or sheep or goats from the flock.

Many Jews read excerpts from and allusions to the instructions in the parashah as part of the readings on the offerings after the Sabbath morning blessings.

The Weekly Maqam
In the Weekly Maqam, Sephardi Jews each week base the songs of the services on the content of that week's parashah. For Parashat Vayikra, Sephardi Jews apply Maqam Rast, the maqam that shows a beginning or an initiation of something, as with this parashah, Jews begin the book of Leviticus.

Haftarah

Generally

Summary
God formed the people of Israel that they might praise God, but they did not call upon God, nor did they bring God their burnt offerings, meal offerings, frankincense, or the fat of their sacrifices. Rather, they burdened God with their sins. God blots out their transgressions for God's own sake. Their first father sinned, and their intercessors transgressed, and so God abandoned the sanctuary and the Israelites to condemnation.

And yet God told the people of Israel not to fear, for God would pour water upon the thirsty land, and God's blessing upon their offspring, and they would spring up like grass. And they would call themselves the Lord's, by the name of Jacob, and by the name of Israel.

God declared that God is the first and the last, and beside God there is no God, no One Who can proclaim what the future will be, no other Rock. Those who fashion graven images shall not profit; they shall be shamed together. The smith makes an ax, and the carpenter forms the figure of a man. He hews down cedars and oaks, and uses the same wood for fuel to warm himself and to make a god to worship. They do not know nor understand that they strive after ashes.

God called on the people of Israel to remember these things, and not forget God who formed them and blotted out their sins. God called on the heaven and earth, mountain and forest to sing, for God had redeemed Israel for God's glory.

Connection to the Parashah
Both the parashah and the haftarah address sacrifices to God. Both the parashah and the haftarah address burnt offerings ('''olah), meal offerings (minchah), frankincense (levonah), and witnesses (ed or eday).

On Shabbat Rosh Chodesh

On Shabbat Zachor
When the parashah coincides with Shabbat Zachor (the special Sabbath immediately preceding Purim—as it does in 2022, 2024, 2027, and 2030), the haftarah is:
for Ashkenazi Jews: 1 Samuel ;
for Sephardi Jews: .

Connection to the Special Sabbath
On Shabbat Zachor, the Sabbath just before Purim, Jews read , which instructs Jews: "Remember (zachor) what Amalek did" in attacking the Israelites. Purim, in turn, commemorates the story of Esther and the Jewish people's victory over Haman's plan to kill the Jews, told in the book of Esther.  identifies Haman as an Agagite, and thus a descendant of Amalek.  identifies the Agagites with the Amalekites. Alternatively, a Midrash tells the story that between King Agag's capture by Saul and his killing by Samuel, Agag fathered a child, from whom Haman in turn descended.

See also
Udhiyyah or Qurbani (sacrifice in Islam)

Notes

Further reading
The parashah has parallels or is discussed in these classical sources:

Biblical
 (vows).
 (vows).
 (vows).
 (vows).
 (sacrifices from all people).
 (preferring obedience to sacrifices).
 (the just does not rob).
 (the offering of our lips instead of bulls).
 (unknowing sin);  (burnt offerings);  (sacrifices);  (sacrifices of thanksgiving);  (sacrifices);  (burnt offerings);  (sacrifices of thanksgiving);  (sacrifices of thanksgiving).

Early nonrabbinic
The Wisdom of Ben Sira 50:1–29. Jerusalem, circa 180 BCE.
Philo. Allegorical Interpretation 3:48:143–49:144; On the Sacrifices of Cain and Abel 36:118; On the Posterity of Cain 35:123; On the Preliminary Studies 30:169; On the Change of Names 41:234; On Dreams 1:14:81, 2:10:71, 44:296; On the Special Laws 1: 37:199, 42:233, 43:236, 53:289; 2: 6:26; 4: 23:119, 123. Alexandria, Egypt, early 1st century CE. In, e.g., The Works of Philo: Complete and Unabridged, New Updated Edition. Translated by Charles Duke Yonge, pages 66, 108, 144, 319, 361, 372, 393, 409, 553, 556, 561, 570, 627–28. Peabody, Massachusetts: Hendrickson Publishers, 1993.
Josephus, Antiquities of the Jews 3:9:1–4 . Circa 93–94. In, e.g., The Works of Josephus: Complete and Unabridged, New Updated Edition. Translated by William Whiston, pages 94–95. Peabody, Massachusetts: Hendrickson Publishers, 1987.

Classical rabbinic
Mishnah: Berakhot 1:1; Shekalim 6:6; Nedarim 1:1–11:12; Bava Kamma 9:7; Sanhedrin 4:5; Shevuot 1:1–8:6; Horayot 1:1–3:8; Zevachim 1:1–14:10; Menachot 1:1–13:11; Chullin 1:4, 7:1; Arakhin 5:6; Keritot 1:2, 2:4, 4:3, 6:6–9; Kinnim 1:1–3:6; Parah 1:4. Land of Israel, circa 200 CE. In, e.g., The Mishnah: A New Translation. Translated by Jacob Neusner, pages 3, 261, 406–30, 524, 591, 616, 620–39, 689–766, 779, 817, 837, 839, 845, 849–50, 883–89, 1014. New Haven: Yale University Press, 1988.
Tosefta: Peah 3:8; Demai 2:7; Challah 2:7; Bikkurim 2:1; Kippurim (Yoma) 1:5; Nedarim 1:1–7:8; Bava Kamma 7:5; Makkot 5:2–3; Shevuot 1:6–3:8; Horayot 1:1–2:13; Zevachim 1:1–13:20; Menachot 1:1–13:23; Chullin 9:14; Keritot 2:13–15. Land of Israel, circa 250 CE. In, e.g., The Tosefta: Translated from the Hebrew, with a New Introduction. Translated by Jacob Neusner, volume 1, pages 65, 85, 339, 348, 542, 785–805; volume 2, pages 987, 1214, 1219–44, 1295–1369, 1401–02, 1429–30, 1437, 1453, 1562–63 1563. Peabody, Massachusetts: Hendrickson Publishers, 2002.
Sifra 1:1–69:1. Land of Israel, 4th century CE. In, e.g., Sifra: An Analytical Translation. Translated by Jacob Neusner, volume 1, pages 65–345. Atlanta: Scholars Press, 1988.
Jerusalem Talmud: Berakhot 8a; Terumot 31b, 71b; Challah 7a, 8a, 33a; Shabbat 23a, 77b, 85b, 89b; Pesachim 18a, 36b, 37a, 38a–b, 43a, 78b; Shekalim 8a, 15a, 49a–b; Yoma 2a, 8a, 11a–b, 12b, 14b, 16b–17a, 32a, 37a, 38b, 45b, 47a; Taanit 9a; Megillah 16a, 34b; Yevamot 28a, 63b; Nedarim 1a–42b; Nazir 19a, 20b–21a, 22a, 23b, 26b; Sotah 10a, 14b–15a, 18b, 22b, 44b; Gittin 27b; Kiddushin 3b, 16a; Bava Kamma 3b–4a; Sanhedrin 8a, 10a, 23a–b, 28b; Shevuot 1a–49a; Avodah Zarah 7b, 18b; Horayot 1a–18b. Tiberias, Land of Israel, circa 400 C.E. In, e.g., Talmud Yerushalmi. Edited by Chaim Malinowitz, Yisroel Simcha Schorr, and Mordechai Marcus, volumes 1, 7–8, 11, 13, 15, 18–21, 25–26, 29–30, 33–35, 37, 39–41, 44, 46–49. Brooklyn: Mesorah Publications, 2005–20.
Leviticus Rabbah 1:1–7:1; 8:4; 10:3; 22:10. Land of Israel, 5th century. In, e.g., Midrash Rabbah: Leviticus. Translated by Harry Freedman and Maurice Simon, volume 4, pages 1–88, 90, 104, 124, 288. London: Soncino Press, 1939.

Babylonian Talmud: Berakhot 2a, 5a, 31b, 37b; Shabbat 2a–3a, 15a, 25a, 26b, 38a, 68b–69a, 70a, 71b, 103a, 108a; Eruvin 2a, 30b, 57a, 63a, 104a; Pesachim 16b, 32b–33a, 36a, 40a, 43b, 57b, 59a, 62a, 63b, 64b–65b, 66b, 73a, 77b, 83a, 89a, 96b; Yoma 4b–5a, 15b, 20a, 21b, 24a–b, 25b, 26b–27a, 36a–37a, 41a, 44a, 45a, 47a–48a, 50a, 53a, 56b–57b, 58b–59a, 62b, 67b–68b, 73a, 74a, 80a, 85b; Sukkah 30a, 48b, 49b, 56a; Beitzah 20a, 25a, 39a; Rosh Hashanah 5b–6a, 28a, 33a; Taanit 22b; Megillah 8a, 9b, 16a, 20b; Moed Katan 17b; Chagigah 2a, 6a–b, 7b, 10a–11a, 16b, 23b; Yevamot 8b–9a, 32b, 34a, 35b, 83b, 87b, 90a, 100a, 101b, 106a; Ketubot 5b, 30b, 42a–b, 45a, 60a, 106a; Nedarim 2a–91b; Nazir 9b, 23a, 24a, 25a, 27b–28a, 29a, 35a, 36a, 38a, 45a, 47b, 62b; Sotah 14a–15a, 23a, 32a, 33a, 37b, 44b, 46b; Gittin 28b, 71a, 74a; Kiddushin 14a, 24b, 36a–b, 37b, 44a, 50a, 52b–53a, 54b–55a, 57b, 81b; Bava Kamma 2a, 3b, 4b, 9b, 12b–13a, 20b, 40b, 56a, 63b, 65a–67a, 71a, 79b, 86b, 91b, 93a, 94b, 98a–b, 101a, 103a–11a, 112a, 117b; Bava Metzia 3b, 36a, 43a–b, 48a, 54b–55b, 58a, 104a, 111a–b; Bava Batra 26b, 74b, 79a, 88b, 120b, 123b; Sanhedrin 2a, 3b–4b, 13b–14a, 18b, 30a, 34b, 37b, 42b, 47a, 52a, 61b–62a, 83a, 84a, 87a, 101a, 107a; Makkot 13a, 16a, 17a–19a; Shevuot 2a–49b; Avodah Zarah 24b, 29b, 42b, 44a; Horayot 2a–14a; Zevachim 2a–120b; Menachot 2a–110a; Chullin 2b, 5a–b, 11a, 13a–b, 17a, 19b–22b, 27a–b, 30b, 37a, 49a, 61a, 70b–71a, 85a, 90a, 93a, 117a, 123b, 132b, 133b; Bekhorot 15b, 41a–42a, 43b, 53b, 61a; Arakhin 2a, 4a, 17b–18a, 20b–21a; Temurah 2a–3b, 6a, 8a, 15a–b, 17b–18b, 19b–20a, 22a, 23b, 28a–29a, 32b; Keritot 2a, 3a, 4a–5a, 7a–b, 9a, 10b, 11b–12b, 18b–19b, 22a–b, 23b, 24b, 25b–28b; Meilah 2b, 8a–b, 9b–10a, 15a, 18a–b, 19b–20a; Tamid 28b, 29b, 31b; Niddah 28b, 41a, 70b. Sasanian Empire, 6th century. In, e.g., Talmud Bavli. Edited by Yisroel Simcha Schorr, Chaim Malinowitz, and Mordechai Marcus, 72 volumes. Brooklyn: Mesorah Pubs., 2006.

Medieval
Rashi. Commentary. Leviticus 1–5. Troyes, France, late 11th century. In, e.g., Rashi. The Torah: With Rashi's Commentary Translated, Annotated, and Elucidated. Translated and annotated by Yisrael Isser Zvi Herczeg, volume 3, pages 1–57. Brooklyn: Mesorah Publications, 1994.
Rashbam. Commentary on the Torah. Troyes, early 12th century. In, e.g., Rashbam's Commentary on Leviticus and Numbers: An Annotated Translation. Edited and translated by Martin I. Lockshin, pages 11–33. Providence: Brown Judaic Studies, 2001.
Judah Halevi. Kuzari. 3:60. Toledo, Spain, 1130–1140. In, e.g., Jehuda Halevi. Kuzari: An Argument for the Faith of Israel. Introduction by Henry Slonimsky, page 184. New York: Schocken, 1964.
Abraham ibn Ezra. Commentary on the Torah. Mid-12th century. In, e.g., Ibn Ezra's Commentary on the Pentateuch: Leviticus (Va-yikra). Translated and annotated by H. Norman Strickman and Arthur M. Silver, volume 3, pages 1–28. New York: Menorah Publishing Company, 2004.
Maimonides. Mishneh Torah: Hilchot Teshuvah. Chapter 1, ¶ 1. Egypt. Circa 1170–1180. In, e.g., Mishneh Torah: Hilchot Teshuvah: The Laws of Repentance. Translated by Eliyahu Touger, pages 6–7. New York: Moznaim, Publishing, 1990.
Hezekiah ben Manoah. Hizkuni. France, circa 1240. In, e.g., Chizkiyahu ben Manoach. Chizkuni: Torah Commentary. Translated and annotated by Eliyahu Munk, volume 3, pages 656–78. Jerusalem: Ktav Publishers, 2013.
Nachmanides. Commentary on the Torah. Jerusalem, circa 1270. In, e.g., Ramban (Nachmanides): Commentary on the Torah. Translated by Charles B. Chavel, volume 3, pages 6–58. New York: Shilo Publishing House, 1974.
Zohar, part 3, pages 2a–26a. Spain, late 13th century.
Bahya ben Asher. Commentary on the Torah. Spain, early 14th century. In, e.g., Midrash Rabbeinu Bachya: Torah Commentary by Rabbi Bachya ben Asher. Translated and annotated by Eliyahu Munk, volume 5, pages 1463–527. Jerusalem: Lambda Publishers, 2003.
Jacob ben Asher (Baal Ha-Turim). Rimze Ba'al ha-Turim. Early 14th century. In, e.g., Baal Haturim Chumash: Vayikra/Leviticus. Translated by Eliyahu Touger, edited, elucidated, and annotated by Avie Gold, volume 3, pages 1019–53. Brooklyn: Mesorah Publications, 2000.
Jacob ben Asher. Perush Al ha-Torah. Early 14th century. In, e.g., Yaakov ben Asher. Tur on the Torah. Translated and annotated by Eliyahu Munk, volume 3, pages 778–805. Jerusalem: Lambda Publishers, 2005.
Isaac ben Moses Arama. Akedat Yizhak (The Binding of Isaac). Late 15th century. In, e.g., Yitzchak Arama. Akeydat Yitzchak: Commentary of Rabbi Yitzchak Arama on the Torah. Translated and condensed by Eliyahu Munk, volume 2, pages 544–58. New York, Lambda Publishers, 2001.

Modern
Isaac Abravanel. Commentary on the Torah. Italy, between 1492 and 1509. In, e.g., Abarbanel: Selected Commentaries on the Torah: Volume 3: Vayikra/Leviticus. Translated and annotated by Israel Lazar, pages 15–58. Brooklyn: CreateSpace, 2015. And excerpted in, e.g., Abarbanel on the Torah: Selected Themes. Translated by Avner Tomaschoff, pages 360–81. Jerusalem: Jewish Agency for Israel, 2007.
Obadiah ben Jacob Sforno. Commentary on the Torah. Venice, 1567. In, e.g., Sforno: Commentary on the Torah. Translation and explanatory notes by Raphael Pelcovitz, pages 499–513. Brooklyn: Mesorah Publications, 1997.
Moshe Alshich. Commentary on the Torah. Safed, circa 1593. In, e.g., Moshe Alshich. Midrash of Rabbi Moshe Alshich on the Torah. Translated and annotated by Eliyahu Munk, volume 2, pages 619–33. New York, Lambda Publishers, 2000.
Avraham Yehoshua Heschel. Commentaries on the Torah. Cracow, Poland, mid 17th century. Compiled as Chanukat HaTorah. Edited by Chanoch Henoch Erzohn. Piotrkow, Poland, 1900. In Avraham Yehoshua Heschel. Chanukas HaTorah: Mystical Insights of Rav Avraham Yehoshua Heschel on Chumash. Translated by Avraham Peretz Friedman, pages 205–06. Southfield, Michigan: Targum Press/Feldheim Publishers, 2004.

Thomas Hobbes. Leviathan, 3:40, 42. England, 1651. Reprint edited by C. B. Macpherson, pages 503–04, 572. Harmondsworth, England: Penguin Classics, 1982.
Shabbethai Bass. Sifsei Chachamim. Amsterdam, 1680. In, e.g., Sefer Vayikro: From the Five Books of the Torah: Chumash: Targum Okelos: Rashi: Sifsei Chachamim: Yalkut: Haftaros, translated by Avrohom Y. Davis, pages 1–84. Lakewood Township, New Jersey: Metsudah Publications, 2012.
Chaim ibn Attar. Ohr ha-Chaim. Venice, 1742. In Chayim ben Attar. Or Hachayim: Commentary on the Torah. Translated by Eliyahu Munk, volume 3, pages 924–86. Brooklyn: Lambda Publishers, 1999.
Yitzchak Magriso. Me'am Lo'ez. Constantinople, 1753. In Yitzchak Magriso. The Torah Anthology: MeAm Lo'ez. Translated by Aryeh Kaplan, volume 11, pages 1–117. New York: Moznaim Publishing, 1989.
Nachman of Breslov. Teachings. Bratslav, Ukraine, before 1811. In Rebbe Nachman's Torah: Breslov Insights into the Weekly Torah Reading: Exodus-Leviticus. Compiled by Chaim Kramer, edited by Y. Hall, pages 301–13. Jerusalem: Breslov Research Institute, 2011.

Samuel David Luzzatto (Shadal). Commentary on the Torah. Padua, 1871. In, e.g., Samuel David Luzzatto. Torah Commentary. Translated and annotated by Eliyahu Munk, volume 3, pages 897–915. New York: Lambda Publishers, 2012.
H. Clay Trumbull. The Salt Covenant. New York, 1899. Reprinted in Kirkwood, Missouri: Impact Christian Books, 1999.
Yehudah Aryeh Leib Alter. Sefat Emet. Góra Kalwaria (Ger), Poland, before 1906. Excerpted in The Language of Truth: The Torah Commentary of Sefat Emet. Translated and interpreted by Arthur Green, pages 147–51. Philadelphia: Jewish Publication Society, 1998. Reprinted 2012.

Hermann Cohen. Religion of Reason: Out of the Sources of Judaism. Translated with an introduction by Simon Kaplan; introductory essays by Leo Strauss, pages 200, 214. New York: Ungar, 1972. Reprinted Atlanta: Scholars Press, 1995. Originally published as Religion der Vernunft aus den Quellen des Judentums. Leipzig: Gustav Fock, 1919.
George Buchanan Gray. Sacrifice in the Old Testament: Its Theory and Practice. Oxford: Oxford University Press, 1925. Reprinted by Ktav Publishing House, 1971.
Alexander Alan Steinbach. Sabbath Queen: Fifty-four Bible Talks to the Young Based on Each Portion of the Pentateuch, pages 74–77. New York: Behrman's Jewish Book House, 1936.
Roland De Vaux. Studies in Old Testament Sacrifice. University of Wales Press, 1964.
Anson Rainey. "Sacrifice." In Encyclopaedia Judaica, volume 14, pages 599–607. Jerusalem: Keter Publishing House, 1972.
Jacob Milgrom. Cult and Conscience: The Asham and the Priestly Doctrine of Repentance. E.J. Brill, 1976.
Jacob Milgrom. "Sacrifices and Offerings, OT," and "Wave offering." In The Interpreter's Dictionary of the Bible. Supp. volume, pages 763–71, 944–46. Nashville, Tenn.: Abingdon, 1976.
Gordon J. Wenham. The Book of Leviticus, pages 47–112. Grand Rapids, Michigan: William B. Eerdmans Publishing Company, 1979.
Pinchas H. Peli. Torah Today: A Renewed Encounter with Scripture, pages 105–09. Washington, D.C.: B'nai B'rith Books, 1987.
Mark S. Smith. The Early History of God: Yahweh and the Other Deities in Ancient Israel, pages 2, 100. New York: HarperSanFrancisco, 1990.
Harvey J. Fields. A Torah Commentary for Our Times: Volume II: Exodus and Leviticus, pages 97–103. New York: UAHC Press, 1991.
Victor Avigdor Hurowitz. “Review Essay: Ancient Israelite Cult in History, Tradition, and Interpretation.” AJS Review, volume 19, number 2 (1994): pages 213–36.
Walter C. Kaiser Jr., "The Book of Leviticus," in The New Interpreter's Bible, volume 1, pages 1005–42. Nashville: Abingdon Press, 1994.
Judith S. Antonelli. "Animal Sacrifice." In In the Image of God: A Feminist Commentary on the Torah, pages 233–46. Northvale, New Jersey: Jason Aronson, 1995.
Ellen Frankel. The Five Books of Miriam: A Woman’s Commentary on the Torah, pages 151–55. New York: G. P. Putnam's Sons, 1996.
W. Gunther Plaut. The Haftarah Commentary, pages 232–43. New York: UAHC Press, 1996.
Sorel Goldberg Loeb and Barbara Binder Kadden. Teaching Torah: A Treasury of Insights and Activities, pages 165–71. Denver: A.R.E. Publishing, 1997.
Jacob Milgrom. Leviticus 1–16, volume 3, pages 129–378. New York: Anchor Bible, 1998.
Susan Freeman. Teaching Jewish Virtues: Sacred Sources and Arts Activities, pages 165–78. Springfield, New Jersey: A.R.E. Publishing, 1999..
Shoshana Gelfand. "The Book of Relationships." In The Women's Torah Commentary: New Insights from Women Rabbis on the 54 Weekly Torah Portions. Edited by Elyse Goldstein, pages 185–90. Woodstock, Vermont: Jewish Lights Publishing, 2000.
Frank H. Gorman Jr. “Leviticus.” In The HarperCollins Bible Commentary. Edited by James L. Mays, pages 146–50. New York: HarperCollins Publishers, revised edition, 2000.
Lainie Blum Cogan and Judy Weiss. Teaching Haftarah: Background, Insights, and Strategies, pages 286–94. Denver: A.R.E. Publishing, 2002.
Michael Fishbane. The JPS Bible Commentary: Haftarot, pages 147–55. Philadelphia: Jewish Publication Society, 2002.
Alan Lew. This Is Real and You Are Completely Unprepared: The Days of Awe as a Journey of Transformation, pages 108–09. Boston: Little, Brown and Co., 2003.
Robert Alter. The Five Books of Moses: A Translation with Commentary, pages 547–63. New York: W.W. Norton & Co., 2004.
Jacob Milgrom. Leviticus: A Book of Ritual and Ethics: A Continental Commentary, pages xii, 6–62, 70–71, 73–78, 85, 95–96, 99, 117, 126, 138–39, 143–44, 146–47, 151, 157, 162, 168, 170–71, 176, 181, 186, 190, 192, 195, 211, 214, 226–30, 266, 270–71, 291, 323–24, 327, 333. Minneapolis: Fortress Press, 2004.
Antony Cothey. “Ethics and Holiness in the Theology of Leviticus.” Journal for the Study of the Old Testament, volume 30, number 2 (December 2005): pages 131–51.
Professors on the Parashah: Studies on the Weekly Torah Reading Edited by Leib Moscovitz, pages 163–65. Jerusalem: Urim Publications, 2005.
Bernard J. Bamberger. “Leviticus.” In The Torah: A Modern Commentary: Revised Edition. Edited by W. Gunther Plaut; revised edition edited by David E.S. Stern, pages 658–85. New York: Union for Reform Judaism, 2006.
Suzanne A. Brody. "A Priest's Expiation." In Dancing in the White Spaces: The Yearly Torah Cycle and More Poems, page 85. Shelbyville, Kentucky: Wasteland Press, 2007.
James L. Kugel. How To Read the Bible: A Guide to Scripture, Then and Now, pages 301–03, 324, 503. New York: Free Press, 2007.
Christophe Nihan. From Priestly Torah to Pentateuch: A Study in the Composition of the Book of Leviticus. Coronet Books, 2007.
James W. Watts. Ritual and Rhetoric in Leviticus: From Sacrifice to Scripture. New York: Cambridge University Press, 2007.
The Torah: A Women's Commentary. Edited by Tamara Cohn Eskenazi and Andrea L. Weiss, pages 569–92. New York: URJ Press, 2008.
Charlotte Elisheva Fonrobert. "Bodily Perfection in the Sanctuary: Parashat Vayikra (Leviticus 1:1–5:26)." In Torah Queeries: Weekly Commentaries on the Hebrew Bible. Edited by Gregg Drinkwater, Joshua Lesser, and David Shneer; foreword by Judith Plaskow, pages 123–28. New York: New York University Press, 2009.
Reuven Hammer. Entering Torah: Prefaces to the Weekly Torah Portion, pages 143–46. New York: Gefen Publishing House, 2009.
Roy E. Gane. "Leviticus." In Zondervan Illustrated Bible Backgrounds Commentary. Edited by John H. Walton, volume 1, pages 289–96. Grand Rapids, Michigan: Zondervan, 2009.
Leigh M. Trevaskis. “On a Recent ‘Existential’ Translation of ḥāṭāʾ.” Vetus Testamentum, volume 59, number 2 (2009): pages 313–19.
Mark Leuchter. “The Politics of Ritual Rhetoric: A Proposed Sociopolitical Context for the Redaction of Leviticus 1–16.” Vetus Testamentum, volume 60, number 3 (2010): pages 345–65.
Jeffrey Stackert. “Leviticus.” In The New Oxford Annotated Bible: New Revised Standard Version with the Apocrypha: An Ecumenical Study Bible. Edited by Michael D. Coogan, Marc Z. Brettler, Carol A. Newsom, and Pheme Perkins, pages 143–49. New York: Oxford University Press, Revised 4th Edition 2010.

William G. Dever. The Lives of Ordinary People in Ancient Israel: When Archaeology and the Bible Intersect, pages 188, 244. Grand Rapids, Michigan: William B. Eerdmans Publishing Company, 2012.
Shmuel Herzfeld. “The Calling.” In Fifty-Four Pick Up: Fifteen-Minute Inspirational Torah Lessons, pages 143–46. Jerusalem: Gefen Publishing House, 2012.
Liel Leibovitz. "Leviticus, the Video Game: A new iPhone game turns the Bible's most detailed book into fast-paced, educational entertainment." Tablet Magazine. (March 8, 2013).
Moshe Waldoks. "Leviticus 1:1–5:26: How Do We Come Closer to God?" The Huffington Post. (March 12, 2013).
Baruch J. Schwartz. "Leviticus." In The Jewish Study Bible: Second Edition. Edited by Adele Berlin and Marc Zvi Brettler, pages 196–206. New York: Oxford University Press, 2014.
Annette Yoshiko Reed. “From Sacrifice to the Slaughterhouse: Ancient and Modern Approaches to Meat, Animals, and Civilization.” (2015).

Jonathan Sacks. Covenant & Conversation: A Weekly Reading of the Jewish Bible: Leviticus: The Book of Holiness, pages 51–98. Jerusalem: Maggid Books, 2015.
Jonathan Sacks. Lessons in Leadership: A Weekly Reading of the Jewish Bible, pages 123–28. New Milford, Connecticut: Maggid Books, 2015.
Jonathan Sacks. Essays on Ethics: A Weekly Reading of the Jewish Bible, pages 153–57. New Milford, Connecticut: Maggid Books, 2016.
Shai Held. The Heart of Torah, Volume 2: Essays on the Weekly Torah Portion: Leviticus, Numbers, and Deuteronomy, pages 3–14. Philadelphia: Jewish Publication Society, 2017.
Steven Levy and Sarah Levy. The JPS Rashi Discussion Torah Commentary, pages 77–79. Philadelphia: Jewish Publication Society, 2017.
Bill Dauster. "When Leaders Do Wrong." Washington Jewish Week, March 26, 2020, page 35.

External links

Texts
Masoretic text and 1917 JPS translation
Hear the parashah chanted
Hear the parashah read in Hebrew

Commentaries

Academy for Jewish Religion, California
Academy for Jewish Religion, New York
Aish.com 
Akhlah: The Jewish Children's Learning Network 
Aleph Beta Academy
American Jewish University—Ziegler School of Rabbinic Studies
Anshe Emes Synagogue, Los Angeles 
Ari Goldwag
Ascent of Safed
Bar-Ilan University 
Chabad.org
eparsha.com
G-dcast
The Israel Koschitzky Virtual Beit Midrash
Jewish Agency for Israel
Jewish Theological Seminary
Mechon Hadar
Miriam Aflalo 
MyJewishLearning.com
Ohr Sameach
ON Scripture—The Torah
Orthodox Union
OzTorah, Torah from Australia
Oz Ve Shalom—Netivot Shalom
Pardes from Jerusalem
Professor James L. Kugel
Professor Michael Carasik 
Rabbi Dov Linzer
Rabbi Fabian Werbin
Rabbi Jonathan Sacks
Rabbi Shlomo Riskin
Rabbi Shmuel Herzfeld
Rabbi Stan Levin 
Reconstructionist Judaism 
Sephardic Institute 
Shiur.com
613.org Jewish Torah Audio
Talia Davis
Tanach Study Center
Teach613.org, Torah Education at Cherry Hill
TheTorah.com
Torah from Dixie 
Torah.org
TorahVort.com
Union for Reform Judaism
United Synagogue of Conservative Judaism 
What's Bothering Rashi?
Yeshivat Chovevei Torah
Yeshiva University

Weekly Torah readings in Adar
Weekly Torah readings in Nisan
Weekly Torah readings from Leviticus